Bafinivirus is a genus in the subfamily Piscanivirinae. It contains two species, one being White bream virus (WBV) which was isolated from white bream in Germany.

References

External links 
 Bafinivirus Viral Zone

Nidovirales
Zoonoses
Virus genera